So Cold may refer to:

"So Cold" (Breaking Benjamin song), 2004
"So Cold" (Mahalo, DLMT, and Lily Denning song), 2019 
So Cold (album), a 2001 album by Jay Tee, or the title song
"So Cold", a song by Chris Brown from Graffiti
"So Cold", a song by Thee Attacks
"So Cold", a song and enemy from Undertale
"So Cold", a song in Season 2 of ''Centaurworld.